The Certification Commission for Health Information Technology (CCHIT) was an independent, 501(c)3 nonprofit organization with the public mission of accelerating adoption of robust, interoperable health information technology in the United States. The Commission certified electronic health record technology (EHR) from 2006 until 2014. It was approved by the Office of the National Coordinator for Health Information Technology (ONC) of the U.S. Department of Health and Human Services (HHS) as an Authorized Testing and Certification Body (ONC-ATCB). The CCHIT Certified program is an independently developed certification that includes a rigorous inspection of an EHR's integrated functionality, interoperability and security using  criteria developed by CCHIT's broadly representative, expert work groups. These products may also be certified in the ONC-ATCB certification program.

History
CCHIT was founded in 2004 with support from three leading industry associations in healthcare information management and technology: the American Health Information Management Association (AHIMA), the Healthcare Information and Management Systems Society (HIMSS) and the National Alliance for Health Information Technology (the Alliance). In September 2005, CCHIT was awarded a 3-year contract by the U.S. Department of Health and Human Services (HHS) to develop and evaluate the certification criteria and inspection process for EHRs and the networks through which they interoperate. In October 2006, HHS officially designated CCHIT as a Recognized Certification Body (RCB). In July 2010, HHS published new rules for recognizing testing and certification bodies, scheduled to take effect when it named the new bodies. In September 2010, the Office of the National Coordinator (ONC) of HHS named CCHIT again under these new rules. CCHIT is an ONC Authorized Testing and Certification Body (ONC-ATCB).

Goals

 Reduce the risk of Healthcare Information Technology (HIT) investment by physicians and other providers
 Ensure interoperability (compatibility) of HIT products
 Assure payers and purchasers providing incentives for electronic health records (EHR) adoption that the ROI will be improved quality
 Protect the privacy of patients' personal health information.

Operations
CCHIT focused its first efforts on ambulatory EHR products for the office-based physician and provider and began commercial certification in May 2006.

CCHIT then developed a process of certification for inpatient EHR products and launched that program in 2007.

CCHIT then assessed the need for, and potential benefit of, certifying EHR for specialty medicine, special care settings, and special-needs populations.

CCHIT, in a collaboration with the MITRE Corporation, also developed an open-source program called Laika to test EHR software for compliance with federally named interoperability standards.

In January 2014, Information Week reported that CCHIT would exit the EHR certification business. 

On November 14, 2014, CCHIT ceased all operations.

Announcements of CCHIT Certified Products
 On July 18, 2006, CCHIT released its first list of 20 certified ambulatory EMR and EHR products 
 On July 31, 2006, CCHIT announced that two additional EHR products had achieved certification.
 On October 23, 2006, CCHIT released its second list of 11 certified vendors.
 On April 30, 2007, CCHIT released its third list of 18 certified vendors.
 On November 16, 2009, CCHIT released its initial draft criteria for Behavioral Health, Clinical Research, and Dermatology EHRs, with expected final publication available July 2010.

Commissioners
The Commission, chaired by Karen Bell, M.D., M.M.S, was composed of 21 members each serving two-year terms.

Stakeholders
Certified EHR products benefit many interested groups and individuals:
 Physicians, hospitals, health care systems, safety net providers, public health agencies and other purchasers of HIT products, who seek quality, interoperability, data portability and security
 Purchasers and payers – from government to the private sector – who are prepared to offer financial incentives for HIT adoption but need the assurance of having a mechanism in place to ensure that products deliver the expected benefits
 Quality improvement organizations that seek out an efficient means of measuring that criteria have been assessed and met
 Standards development and informatics experts that gain consensus on standards
 Vendors who benefit from having to meet a single set of criteria and from having a voice in the process
 Healthcare consumers, ultimately the most important stakeholders, who will benefit from a reliable, accurate and secure record of their health

CCHIT and its volunteer work groups strove to fairly represent the interests of each of these diverse groups in an open forum, communicating the progress of its work and seeking input from all quarters. CCHIT received the endorsements of a number of professional medical organizations, including the American Academy of Family Physicians, the American Academy of Pediatrics, the American College of Physicians, the Physicians' Foundation for Health Systems Excellence and Physicians' Foundation for Health Systems Innovation.

See also
Electronic health record

Notes

External links
 Official website

Electronic health records
Defunct organizations based in the United States
Office of the National Coordinator for Health Information Technology